Ormenio railway station is a railway station that serves the village of Ormenio, Evros in Eastern Macedonia and Thrace, Greece. Today TrainOSE operates just 1 daily Regional train; however, there are waiting rooms available. Ormenio is the northernmost railway station in Greece and the final stop before crossing the border into Bulgaria.

History
The station lies on the line built by the Chemins de fer Orientaux (CO), from Istanbul to Vienna.

The railway was a vital link during World War I as the Ottoman Empire, Bulgaria, and Austria-Hungary were all Central Allies. Following the defeat of the Ottoman Empire, its remaining imperial possessions were divided.

Under the Treaty of Lausanne of 1923, a new border between Greece and Turkey was established at the Evros river, which had the result in the railway from Istanbul to Bulgaria entering Greece at Pythio, then re-entered Turkey at Edirne (Karaağaç railway station), re-entered Greece at Marasia, and finally entered Bulgaria between Ormenio and Svilengrad.  This arrangement continued until 1971 when two new lines were opened.  In Turkey, the Edirne Cut-off was opened to allow trains from Istanbul to Bulgaria to run through Edirne entirely on Turkish territory so that trains such as the Orient Express no longer passed through Ormenio. In Greece, a line was opened to allow trains from Pythio to Bulgaria to stay on Greek territory and avoid Edirne. In 1954 the CFFH was absorbed by the Hellenic State Railways. In 1971, the Hellenic State Railways was reorganised into the OSE taking over responsibilities for most of Greece's rail infrastructure.

In the 1990s, OSE introduced the InterCity service to the Alexandroupoli–Svilengrad line Which reduced travel times across the whole line.

In 2020 it was announced that a section of the line between Pythio and Ormenio was to be upgraded at the cost of €1.4 million as part of an ambitious integrated intergovernmental transport plan which will see this, and 39 other transport sector projects be built, with financing from the European Commission with a total of €117 million. The package of measures aims to build or improve transport connections and connectivity across Europe, with a focus on sustainable transport. The project for the Pythian-Ormenio section envisions upgrading the existing line infrastructure and trackbed, doubling of the track as well as the installation of electrification signalling (ETCS Level 1) along the entire stretch, with the aim of improving freight transport with Bulgaria and Turkey.

Facilities
The station buildings have recently been repaired and upgraded; however, the waiting rooms are barely more than brick shelters. The platforms have no outside seating, Dot-matrix display departure and arrival screens or timetable poster boards for passenger information, and the station remains little more than an unstaffed halt.

Services
, the station is only served by one daily pair of regional trains Alexandroupoli–Ormenio. There are currently no services to Svilengrad.

Station layout

Migration Criss
In September 2019, 26 Afghan and Pakistani men were found at the station, dressed only in underwear. They had been robbed and left close to the Bulgarian border. It was later reported that the men were left in Greece by Bulgarian smugglers after they first stole everything they had on them. Locals provided food and clothing to men, some no older than 16. The 26 were eventually transferred to the Orestiada Border Guard Department, which is in the process of drafting the case file and is then expected to be transferred to the PRT for recording and identification. Both the local authorities and Frontex are investigating the incident.

References

External links
 Ormenio Station - National Railway Network Greek Travel Pages

Railway stations in Eastern Macedonia and Thrace
Railway stations opened in the 1870s
Greece–Turkey border crossings
Buildings and structures in Evros (regional unit)